Peter Nagy (born 1959) is an American artist and gallerist. Nagy is the owner of Gallery Nature Morte, founded in New York City and now located in India.

Early life
Nagy was born in 1959 in Bridgeport, Connecticut. He studied at the Parsons School of Design, receiving a degree in communication design in 1981.

Career as gallerist 

With the artist Alan Belcher, Nagy opened Gallery Nature Morte in East Village, Manhattan, New York City in 1982. Nagy was a part of a generation of the East Village artist-gallery owners who established a small and rough but trendy avant-garde alternative to the established SoHo art scene. The gallery was open for six years, until 1988. They combined conceptualism and pop art, exploring the relationship between the art and the commodity.

In 1992, Nagy moved to New Delhi where he revived Gallery Nature Morte in 1997. The Indian artist Subodh Gupta has said of him: "he has fresh eyes and has provided a platform for contemporary artists." In 2021 the gallery opened two additional exhibition spaces in Delhi.

Art career
In the early 1980s Nagy became known for works he created by mixing painting techniques with the technology of Xerox photocopy machines. One series executed during this period, International Survey Condominiums, used photocopying as a tool to combine timelines of art history with the floorplans of art museums.

Nagy's work is included in the collection of the Whitney Museum, the Los Angeles Museum of Contemporary Art, the Brooklyn Museum and the Metropolitan Museum of Art.

In 2014 Eisbox Projects published an exhaustive account of Nagy's work by Richard Milazzo in the book PETER NAGY, Entertainment Erases History: Works 1982 to 2004 to the Present. In 2020, Deitch Projects in New York City held a retrospective exhibition of Nagy's works from the 1980s.

See also 
 Post-conceptual art
 Conceptual art

References

Further reading 
Richard Milazzo, "Peter Nagy: Entertainment Erases History. Works 1982 to 2004 to the Present" Brooklyn, Eisbox Projects (2014)
Peter Nagy on Decades as an Artist and Dealer Both, ARTnews, Anne Duran, July 24, 2020 

Avant-garde art
New media artists
Living people
American expatriates in India
1959 births
Artists from Bridgeport, Connecticut